Francisco Merino Molina is a noted Spanish practitioner of karate. At the 18th edition of the European Karate Championships in 1983, held in Madrid, he received the gold medal in men's kumite in the under-75 kg category

In 1984 he participated in the seventh edition of the Karate World Championship, where he won a bronze medal (for teams) together with José Pérez, Felipe Hita, Oscar Zazo, José Manuel Egea, José María Torres and Antonio M. Amillo.

Today he continues to devote himself to karate, giving classes and preparing competitors as a master of the Shito-Ryu style.

Competition record

References

Karate coaches
Spanish male karateka
Living people
Year of birth missing (living people)